This is list of archives in Thailand.

Archives in Thailand 

 National Archives of Thailand
 Thai Film Archive
 Maejo University Archives 
 Payap University Archives

See also 

 List of archives
 List of libraries in Thailand
 List of museums in Thailand
 Culture of Thailand

External links 
  (video)

 
Archives
Thailand
Archives